Saša Nedeljković (Cyrillic: Саша Недељковић, born 9 November 1967) is a Serbian former footballer who played as a defender.

Nedeljković was a substitute for Red Star Belgrade in the 1991 European Super Cup and the 1991 Intercontinental Cup. He then played in Australia as well.

References

External links
Yugoslav First League footballers 1945-1992

1967 births
Living people
Yugoslav footballers
Serbia and Montenegro footballers
Serbian footballers
Association football defenders
Yugoslav First League players
OFK Beograd players
FK Rad players
Red Star Belgrade footballers
National Soccer League (Australia) players
Heidelberg United FC players
Adelaide City FC players